Barnby in the Willows is a village and civil parish in the Newark and Sherwood district of Nottinghamshire, England, just east of Newark-on-Trent.  According to the 2001 census it had a population of 244, increasing to 272 at the 2011 Census. Just to the south of the village is the River Witham, which also forms the border with Lincolnshire here.
There are 5 streets composing Barnby, these are
Front Street,
Dark Lane,
Cross Lane,
Long Lane,
Back Lane.

The parish church of All Saints consists of a chancel, nave and two aisles of the 13th century and a west tower which is 15th century. The altar rails are of the early 17th century.

See also
Listed buildings in Barnby in the Willows

References

External links

 village website
 Village history Website
 

Villages in Nottinghamshire
Newark and Sherwood